KRTR may refer to:

 KRTR-FM, a radio station (96.3 FM) licensed to serve Kailua, Hawaii, United States
 KPRP (AM), a defunct radio station (650 AM) formerly licensed to serve Honolulu, Hawaii, which held the call sign KRTR from 2005 to 2013